Hypercallia sincera is a moth in the family Depressariidae. It was described by Edward Meyrick in 1909. It is found in South Africa.

The wingspan is about 24 mm. The forewings and hindwings are ochreous white.

References

Endemic moths of South Africa
Moths described in 1909
Hypercallia